Santa Clara Municipality may refer to:
 Santa Clara Municipality, Durango
 Santa Clara, San Vicente, municipality in El Salvador

Municipality name disambiguation pages